Moca mniograpta is a moth in the family Immidae. It was described by Edward Meyrick in 1931. It is found in Peru.

References

Moths described in 1931
Immidae
Taxa named by Edward Meyrick
Moths of South America